The 2000 Pacific motorcycle Grand Prix was the fifteenth round of the 2000 Grand Prix motorcycle racing season. It took place on 15 October 2000 at the Twin Ring Motegi.

500 cc classification

250cc classification

125 cc classification

Championship standings after the race (500cc)

Below are the standings for the top five riders and constructors after round fifteen has concluded. 

Riders' Championship standings

Constructors' Championship standings

 Note: Only the top five positions are included for both sets of standings.

References

Pacific motorcycle Grand Prix
Pacific
Pacific Motorcycle Grand Prix